Selmir is a given name. Notable people with the name include:

 Selmir (footballer) (born 1979), full name Selmir dos Santos Bezerra, Brazilian footballer
 Selmir Pidro (born 1998), Bosnian footballer
 Selmir Miscic (born 2003), American soccer player

See also
 Semir (given name)